Lombardia was a protected cruiser of the Italian Regia Marina (Royal Navy) built in the 1890s. The ship was the second of six vessels in its class, but was the first to enter service. Named for the region of Lombardy, she was laid down in November 1889, was launched in July 1890, and was completed in February 1893.

Lombardia served in a variety of roles throughout her career. She was initially assigned as a scout for the main Italian fleet before a stint abroad in South America, where an outbreak of yellow fever killed half of her crew. Another period in the main fleet followed in the late 1890s, and in 1901, the ship was deployed to the China station. In late 1903, she cruised off Italian Somaliland, and in 1906 she was converted to a depot ship for submarines. She served in this role for the remainder of her career, including during the Italo-Turkish War in 1911–1912 and World War I in 1915–1918. Lombardia was eventually sold for scrap in July 1920.

Design

The ships had a ram bow and a flush deck. Each vessel was fitted with a pair of pole masts. She had a crew of between 213 and 278.

Her propulsion system consisted of a pair of horizontal triple-expansion steam engines that drove two screw propellers. Steam was supplied by four cylindrical fire-tube boilers that were vented into two funnels.

Lombardia was armed with a main battery of four  L/40 guns mounted singly, with two side by side forward and two side by side aft. A secondary battery of six  L/40 guns were placed between them, with three on each broadside. Close-range defense against torpedo boats consisted of ten  guns and a pair of machine guns. She was also equipped with two  torpedo tubes.

Service history
Lombardia was built by the Regio Cantieri di Castellammare di Stabia in the eponymous city; her keel was laid on 19 November 1889. She was launched on 12 July 1890, and after completing fitting-out work, the new cruiser was commissioned into the Italian fleet on 16 February 1893, the first member of her class to enter service. Beginning on 14 October that year, the Italian fleet, including Lombardia, assembled in Genoa for a naval review held in honor of King Umberto I at the commissioning of the new ironclad . The festivities lasted three days.

In 1896, Lombardia was in South American waters. An outbreak of yellow fever decimated the ship's crew while she was in Rio de Janeiro; 134 men died as a result of the epidemic. The men were buried in local cemeteries and were eventually re-interred in a large mausoleum in Rio de Janeiro in 1904. She remained in the Reserve Squadron the following year.

Lombardia was deployed to the China station in 1901 to replace her sister . She was joined on the voyage by the armored cruiser , which in turn replaced . In September 1902 Lombardia was in Nagasaki, Japan, with the Italian cruiser . The following month, she joined an international fleet that took part in the funeral of the Chinese Viceroy of Liangjiang, Liu Kunyi. Kunyi had protected Europeans during the Boxer Uprising in 1900–1901, for which he was lauded in the Western press. On 10 May 1903, Lombardia went to Shanghai and steamed up the Yangtze River. She thereafter departed the China station. A landing party attempted to go to shore to negotiate with a group of raiders who had fortified the town, but they were driven off by rifle fire. Lombardia shelled the town in response, but to no effect. The ship then made a stop in Aden in late November – early December.

In 1906, Lombardia was converted into a depot ship for submarines; this work lasted until 1908. By the outbreak of the Italo-Turkish War in September 1911, she was still serving in this capacity, under the command of Prince Luigi Amedeo, then the Inspector of Torpedo Boats. Lombardia remained in the Adriatic Sea during the war and as a result she did not see action in the conflict. She served in this capacity through World War I until 4 July 1920, when she was sold for scrap and subsequently broken up.

Notes

References

External links
 Lombardia Marina Militare website

Regioni-class cruisers
Ships built in Castellammare di Stabia
1890 ships